Clemente Gera (died 23 November 1643) was a Roman Catholic prelate who served as Bishop of Lodi (1625–1643) and Bishop of Terni (1613–1625).

Biography
On 13 November 1613, Clemente Gera was appointed during the papacy of Pope Paul V as Bishop of Terni.
On 30 November 1613, he was consecrated bishop by Paolo Emilio Sfondrati, Cardinal-Bishop of Albano, with Antonio d'Aquino, Bishop of Sarno, and Giovanni Ambrogio Caccia, Bishop Emeritus of Castro del Lazio, serving as co-consecrators. 
On 21 May 1625, he was appointed during the papacy of Pope Urban VIII as Bishop of Lodi.
He served as Bishop of Lodi until his death on 23 November 1643.

References

External links and additional sources
 (for Chronology of Bishops) 
 (for Chronology of Bishops) 
 (for Chronology of Bishops) 
 (for Chronology of Bishops) 

17th-century Italian Roman Catholic bishops
Bishops appointed by Pope Paul V
Bishops appointed by Pope Urban VIII
1643 deaths